Barbara Wall Fraser (born June 17, 1947) is a former American Democrat politician who served in the Missouri House of Representatives.

Born in Raleigh, North Carolina, she attended Meredith College, University of North Carolina at Chapel Hill, and Washington University in St. Louis.  She previously worked as a high school history teacher and served as an elected member for the school board of University City, Missouri.

References

1947 births
Living people
20th-century American politicians
21st-century American politicians
20th-century American women politicians
21st-century American women politicians
Democratic Party members of the Missouri House of Representatives
Women state legislators in Missouri
Meredith College alumni
University of North Carolina at Chapel Hill alumni
Washington University in St. Louis alumni